The Adolph Levin Cottage is a historic vacation property on Kabetogama Lake in St. Louis County, Minnesota, United States.  It contains a log cabin built in 1937 for two friends, Dr. Adolph Levin and George Plager.  A metal water tank and the surrounding landscape are also contributing historic features.  It is now preserved within Voyageurs National Park as an example of the early tourism and recreational properties in the area.  In 2011 the property was listed  on the National Register of Historic Places for its significance in the themes of architecture and entertainment/recreation.  It was nominated for being a representative early-20th-century lake retreat, and for the rustic architecture and traditional Finnish construction of the cabin.

See also
 National Register of Historic Places listings in St. Louis County, Minnesota
 National Register of Historic Places listings in Voyageurs National Park

References

1937 establishments in Minnesota
Finnish-American culture in Minnesota
Houses completed in 1937
Houses in St. Louis County, Minnesota
Houses on the National Register of Historic Places in Minnesota
Log buildings and structures on the National Register of Historic Places in Minnesota
Log cabins in the United States
National Register of Historic Places in St. Louis County, Minnesota
Rustic architecture in Minnesota
National Register of Historic Places in Voyageurs National Park